Asia Pacific Region can refer to:
 Asia-Pacific
 WOSM-Asia-Pacific Region
 WAGGGS-Asia Pacific Region
 Asia-Pacific Economic Cooperation